Violets Are Blue is a 1975 Danish film written and directed by Peter Refn.

Cast 
 Lisbet Lundquist
 Annika Hoydal
 Lisbet Dahl
 Baard Owe
 Holger Juul Hansen
 Ulf Pilgaard
 Klaus Pagh
 Jørgen Kiil
 
 
 
 
 Beatrice Palner

References

External links 
 

1975 films
Danish drama films
1970s Danish-language films
Danish LGBT-related films
1975 LGBT-related films
LGBT-related drama films
Bisexuality-related films